Capitalization rate (or "cap rate") is a real estate valuation measure used to compare different real estate investments. Although there are many variations, the cap rate is generally calculated as the ratio between the annual rental income produced by a real estate asset to its current market value.  Most variations depend on the definition of the annual rental income and whether it is gross or net of annual costs, and whether the annual rental income is the actual amount received (initial yields), or the potential rental income that could be received if the asset was optimally rented (ERV yield).

Basic formula
The rate is calculated in a simple fashion as follows:

Some investors may calculate the cap rate differently.

In instances where the purchase or market value is unknown, investors can determine the capitalization rate using a different equation based upon historical risk premiums, as follows:

Explanatory examples
For example, if a building is purchased for  sale price and it produces  in positive net operating income (the amount left over after fixed costs and variable costs are subtracted from gross lease income) during one year, then:

 = 0.10 = 10%

The asset's capitalization rate is ten percent; one-tenth of the building's cost is paid by the year's net proceeds.

If the owner bought the building twenty years ago for  that is now worth , his cap rate is

 = 0.25 = 25%.

The investor must take into account the opportunity cost of keeping their money tied up in this investment. By keeping this building, they are losing the opportunity of investing  (by selling the building at its market value and investing the proceeds). This is why the current value of the investment, not the actual initial investment, should be used in the cap rate calculation.

As another example of why the current value should be used, consider the case of a building that is given away (as an inheritance or charitable gift). The new owner divides the annual net income by the initial cost, say,

  =  → UNDEFINED

Anybody who invests any amount of money at an undefined rate of return very quickly has an undefined percent return on his investment.

From this, we see that as the value of an asset increases, the amount of income it produces should also increase (at the same rate), in order to maintain the cap rate.

Capitalization rates are an indirect measure of how fast an investment will pay for itself. In the example above, the purchased building will be fully capitalized (pay for itself) after ten years (100% divided by 10%). If the capitalization rate were 5%, the payback period would be twenty years.
Note that a real estate appraisal in the U.S. uses net operating income.  Cash flow equals  net operating income minus debt service. Where sufficiently detailed information is not available, the capitalization rate will be derived or estimated from net operating income to determine cost, value or required annual income.
An investor views his money as a "capital asset". As such, he expects his money to produce more money. Taking into account risk and how much interest is available on investments in other assets, an investor arrives at a personal rate of return he expects from his money. This is the cap rate he expects.

Use for valuation
In real estate investment, real property is often valued according to projected capitalization rates used as investment criteria.  This is done by algebraic manipulation of the formula below:

 

For example, in valuing the projected sale price of an apartment building that produces a net operating income of $10,000, if we set a projected capitalization rate at 7%, then the asset value (or price we would pay to own it) is 

This is often referred to as direct capitalization, and is commonly used for valuing income generating property in a real estate appraisal.

One advantage of capitalization rate valuation is that it is separate from a "market-comparables" approach to an appraisal (which compares 3 valuations: what other similar properties have sold for based on a comparison of physical, location and economic characteristics, actual replacement cost to re-build the structure in addition to the cost of the land and capitalization rates). Given the inefficiency of real estate markets, multiple approaches are generally preferred when valuing a real estate asset. Capitalization rates for similar properties, and particularly for "pure" income properties, are usually compared to ensure that estimated revenue is being properly valued.

Cash flow defined
The capitalization rate is calculated using a measure of cash flow called net operating income (NOI), not net income. Generally, NOI is defined as income (earnings) before depreciation and interest expenses:

  (i.e., tax write-offs. depreciation, and mortgage interest are not factored into NOI);
 whereas 

Depreciation in the tax and accounting sense is excluded from the valuation of the asset, because it does not directly affect the cash generated by the asset. To arrive at a more careful and realistic definition, however, estimated annual maintenance expenses or capital expenditures will be included in the non-interest expenses.

Although NOI is the generally accepted figure used for calculating cap rates (financing and depreciation are ignored), this is often referred to under various terms, including simply income.

Use for comparison
Capitalization rates provide a tool for investors to use for roughly valuing a property based on its Net Operating Income. For example, if a real estate investment provides  a year in Net Operating Income and similar properties have sold based on 8% cap rates, the subject property can be roughly valued at  because  divided by 8% (0.08) equals . A comparatively higher cap rate for a property would indicate greater risk associated with the investment (decreasing demand for the product, and the corresponding value), and a comparatively lower cap rate for a property might indicate less risk (increased demand for the product). Some factors considered in assessing risk include creditworthiness of a tenant, term of lease, quality and location of property, and general volatility of the market.

Factors of Determination 
Cap rates are determined by three major factors; the opportunity cost of capital, growth expectations, and risk.

Commercial real estate investments compete with other assets (e.g. stocks and bonds) for investment dollars. If the opportunity cost of capital is too high, investors will use their capital to purchase other assets and the resulting decreased demand will drive prices down and cap rates up. If the inverse is true, cap rates will be driven down by the increased demand stemming from lower opportunity cost of capital.

The primary source of income in commercial real estate is rent. Rental rates are driven by a variety of supply and demand factors which make up a separate market for rentable space. As investors consider an acquisition, they must project future movements of this market as it relates to the specific asset. If the space market is expected to yield future increases in rental rates, investors will pay a higher price for the current income stream, pushing the cap rate down. If the space market projects a weak outlook, investors will want to pay less, and cap rates will rise.

Being a simplified rate of return measure, cap rates are subject to the same risk/return trade-off as other measures. In short, cap rates move in tandem with risk, real or perceived. While risk aversion varies from person to person, generally, investors are willing to pay more for less risky assets. As such, assets with less risk will carry lower cap rates than assets with higher risk.

Reversionary
Property values based on capitalization rates are calculated on an "in-place" or "passing rent" basis, i.e. given the rental income generated from current tenancy agreements. In addition, a valuer also provides an Estimated Rental Value (ERV). The ERV states the valuer's opinion as to the open market rent which could reasonably be expected to be achieved on the subject property at the time of valuation.

The difference between the in-place rent and the ERV is the reversionary value of the property. Holding the valuers cap rate constant at 8%, we could consider the property as having a current value of  based on passing rent, or  based on ERV.

Finally, if the passing rent payable on a property is equivalent to its ERV, it is said to be "Rack Rented".

Change in asset value
The cap rate only recognizes the cash flow a real estate investment produces and not the change in value of the property.

To get the unlevered rate of return on an investment the real estate investor adds (or subtracts) the price change percentage from the cap rate. For example, a property delivering an 8% capitalization, or cap rate, that increases in value by 2% delivers a 10% overall rate of return. The actual realised rate of return will depend on the amount of borrowed funds, or leverage, used to purchase the asset.

Recent trends
According to a national survey conducted by CBRE in early 2021, typical cap rates in the US varied across geographical regions and urban market, but generally ranged between 4.5% and 6.5% for urban office properties, between 6.5% and 8.0% for suburban office properties, and between 3.5 and 5.0% for multifamily housing properties. Typical cap rates for industrial properties showed a somewhat greater range, from 2.5% to 6.0%. According to the same survey, cap rates for retail properties in early 2021 typically ranged from 5.0 to 7.0%.

The National Council of Real Estate Investment Fiduciaries (NCREIF) in a Sept 30, 2007 report reported that for the prior year, for all properties income return was 5.7% and the appreciation return was 11.1%.

A Wall Street Journal report using data from Real Capital Analytics and Federal Reserve showed that from the beginning of 2001 to end of 2007, the cap rate for offices dropped from about 10% to 5.5%, and for apartments from about 8.5% to 6%.  At the peak of the real estate bubble in 2006 and 2007, some deals were done at even lower rates: for instance, New York City's Stuyvesant Town and Peter Cooper Village apartment buildings sold at a cap rate of 3.1% based on highly optimistic assumptions.  Most deals at these low rates used a great deal of leverage in an attempt to lift equity returns, generating negative cashflows and refinancing difficulties.

As U.S. real estate sale prices have declined faster than rents due to the economic crisis, cap rates have returned to higher levels: as of December 2009, to 8.8% for office buildings in central business districts and 7.36% for apartment buildings.

See also
 Internal rate of return
 Property investment calculator
 Real estate investing
 Real estate investment trust (REIT)
 Yield (finance)

References

Financial ratios
Real estate valuation